Hircine may refer to:

Something of or relating to the domestic goat 
Something of or relating to the members of genus Capra
Hircine, a fictional god from The Elder Scrolls series